The Buayanyup River is a river in the South West region of Western Australia.

The river has three main tributaries of Dawson Gulley, Ironstone Gully and the other is not named.

The river flows through agricultural land that is predominantly used for raising beef and dairy cattle and to a lesser degree plantation timber and viticulture. The area has been settled since 1834 when the Bussell family established a cattle station along the Vasse River. More farming families followed and now over 50% of the catchment is used for cattle farming.

The name of the river was first recorded by a surveyor in 1839 and is Aboriginal in origin but its meaning is unknown.

References

Rivers of the South West region